Omaraj (also known as Omarë) is a settlement in the former Gruemirë municipality in Shkodër County, northern Albania. At the 2015 local government reform it became part of the municipality Malësi e Madhe.

Demographics 
During the early 2010s, the linguists Klaus Steinke and Xhelal Ylli, seeking to corroborate villages cited in past literature as being Slavic-speaking, carried out fieldwork in settlements of the area. Omaraj in the Shkodër area is one of a number of villages with a Slavophone population that speaks a Montenegrin dialect. In the village of Omaraj, only two Orthodox Montenegrin families remain.

References

Gruemirë
Populated places in Malësi e Madhe
Villages in Shkodër County